Kenneth Andrew Olandt (born April 22, 1958) is an American actor, producer, executive producer and businessman. He was born in Richmond, California to Robert and Beverly Olandt.

Ken Olandt is best known for his lead starring role as Detective Zachary Stone in the syndicated series, Super Force (1990–1992, 48 episodes).  He played male stripper Larry Kazamias in the comedy film, Summer School. He appeared in the 1993 horror film, Leprechaun starring Jennifer Aniston and had a recurring role as "Dooley" in the second season of Riptide (1984). He guest-starred as Lydia's innocent alien brother Nigel, in a 1985 episode of V. He made guest appearances on such shows as Supercarrier, Hotel, Rags to Riches, The Young and the Restless, 21 Jump Street, Highway to Heaven, Matt Houston, The Fall Guy, The A-Team, Pacific Blue, JAG, Murder, She Wrote, and Star Trek: The Next Generation.

Due to his commitment with Unified Film Organization, LLC, which he co-founded, Olandt temporarily suspended his acting career to focus on producing, finance, and foreign licensing. The company produced three movies a year and eventually was sold in 2000 to a publicly held German-distribution company. The sale took the company to Bulgaria, at which point, Olandt sold his operation and transitioned into financing.

Filmography

External links

1958 births
Living people
People from Richmond, California
Male actors from California
American male film actors
American male soap opera actors
American male television actors
Television producers from California